Crested Ten is a variety of Irish whiskey made by Jameson. It has an ABV of 40%.

The brand was launched in 1963 and is Jameson's oldest bottled brand. Not 10 years old as the name suggests, it is a fuller, richer, spicy, sherried version of the regular Jameson with the majority of the blend being 7–8 years with approximately 60% of the blend being pot still and 40% grain. Full-bodied with soft, delicate sherry undertones, toasted wood, perfectly balanced with fruit, spices and chocolate.

As of 2006, it is not widely available outside Ireland.

See also
Irish whiskey

References

External links

Irish whiskey
Pernod Ricard brands